The Regiment "Cavalleggeri di Treviso" (28th) ( - "Chevau-légers of Treviso") is an active cavalry unit of the Italian Army. First formed in 1909 and active during World War I and the Cold War the name, flag and traditions of the regiment were assigned on 4 October 2022 to the Command and Tactical Supports Unit "Pozzuolo del Friuli" of the Cavalry Brigade "Pozzuolo del Friuli".

History

World War I 
On 1 October 1909 the Regiment "Cavalleggeri di Treviso" (28th) was formed in Florence with the third squadrons of five existing Cavalleggeri regiments. The new regiment was organized as follows:

 Regiment "Cavalleggeri di Treviso" (28th), in Florence
 1st Squadron — former 3rd Squadron/ Regiment "Cavalleggeri di Saluzzo" (12th)
 2nd Squadron — former 3rd Squadron/ Regiment "Cavalleggeri di Alessandria" (14th)
 3rd Squadron — former 3rd Squadron/ Regiment "Cavalleggeri di Lucca" (16th)
 4th Squadron — former 3rd Squadron/ Regiment "Cavalleggeri di Caserta" (17th)
 5th Squadron — former 3rd Squadron/ Regiment "Cavalleggeri di Catania" (22nd)
 Regimental depot

The regiment provided seven officers and 295 enlisted to fill out units that were deployed for the Italo-Turkish War in 1911–12. At the outbreak of World War I the regiment consisted of a command, the regimental depot, and two cavalry groups, with the I Group consisting of three squadrons and the II Group consisting of two squadrons and a machine gun section. In 1917 the regimental depot in Florence formed the 734th Dismounted Machine Gunners Company as reinforcement for infantry units on the front. Together with the Regiment "Cavalleggeri Guide" (19th) the regiment formed the VIII Cavalry Brigade, which was assigned to the 4th Cavalry Division "Piemonte". The division fought dismounted in the trenches of the Italian Front, where the regiment distinguished itself at Monfalcone and Selz, for which it was awarded a Silver Medal of Military Valour.

After the war the regiment was disbanded on 21 November 1919 and part of its personnel and horses were integrated into the Regiment "Cavalleggeri di Alessandria" (14th) as II Group "Cavalleggeri di Treviso". In 1920 the Cavalleggeri di Alessandria moved from Lucca to Florence, where it took over the Cavalleggeri di Treviso's barracks. On 1 July 1920 the II Group dropped the name "Cavalleggeri di Treviso" and the Treviso's regimental traditions were transferred to the Regiment "Cavalleggeri di Alessandria" (14th).

Cold War 
During the 1975 army reform the army disbanded the regimental level and newly independent battalions were granted for the first time their own flags. On 1 October 1975 the II Squadrons Group of the Regiment "Genova Cavalleria" (4th) in Palmanova was reorganized and renamed 28th Tank Squadrons Group "Cavalleggeri di Treviso". The squadrons group received the name, flag, and traditions of the Regiment "Cavalleggeri di Treviso" (28th) and joined the Armored Brigade "Pozzuolo del Friuli". The squadrons group consisted of a command, a command and services squadron, and three tank squadrons equipped with Leopard 1A2 main battle tanks.

For its conduct and work after the 1976 Friuli earthquake the squadrons group was awarded a Bronze Medal of Army Valour, which was affixed to the battalion's flag and added to the battalion's coat of arms.

After the end of the Cold War the Italian Army began to draw down its forces and the Cavalleggeri di Treviso were one of the first units to disband. On 31 March 1991 the squadrons group was disbanded and on 8 May 1991 the flag of the Regiment "Cavalleggeri di Treviso" (28th) was transferred to the Shrine of the Flags in the Vittoriano in Rome.

2022 Reactivation 
On 4 October 2022 the name, flag and traditions of the Regiment "Cavalleggeri di Treviso" (28th) were assigned to the Command and Tactical Supports Unit "Pozzuolo del Friuli" of the Cavalry Brigade "Pozzuolo del Friuli", which on that date was renamed Command and Tactical Supports Unit "Cavalleggeri di Treviso" (28th).

As of reactivation the unit is organized as follows:

  Command and Tactical Supports Unit "Cavalleggeri di Treviso" (28th), in Gorizia
 Command Squadron
 Signal Company

See also 
 Armored Brigade "Pozzuolo del Friuli"

References

Cavalry Regiments of Italy